Leland Tollett is an American businessman. He served as chief executive officer of Tyson Foods from 1991 to 1998, and as interim CEO in 1999.

Biography

Early life
He graduated from the University of Arkansas in 1958 and received an MSA from the same university in 1959.

Career
He started his career at Tyson Foods in 1959. He became Chief Operating Officer in 1981. He joined its board of directors in 1984. He served as president and CEO from 1991 to 1995, and as chairman and CEO from 1995 to 1998. He also served as interim CEO in 2009, until he was replaced by Donnie Smith. He is under contract to serve as a consultant to the corporation until he dies.

He has sat on the board of directors of J. B. Hunt, a trucking company listed on the NASDAQ, and Worthen Banking Corp., a financial institution (later acquired by Boatmen's Bancshares, followed by NationsBank and finally Bank of America). He was inducted into the Arkansas Business Hall of Fame in 2011 and the Arkansas Agriculture Hall of Fame in 2012.

References

Living people
Year of birth missing (living people)
University of Arkansas alumni
American chief executives of food industry companies
Tyson Foods people